The First Lady of the Republic of Suriname, commonly known as the First Lady of Suriname, is the wife of the President of Suriname.

List of first ladies

References

See also 

 List of spouses of heads of state
 President_of_Suriname#List_of_presidents

Suriname
First Ladies of Suriname